The 2016 King Cup Final was the final match of the 2016 King Cup,  the 41st season of Saudi's main football cup, and the 9th season under the current King Cup title. It was played at the King Abdullah Sports City in Jeddah on 29 May 2016, between Al-Ahli and Al-Nassr.

Al-Ahli took the lead with a 24th-minute header goal by Omar Al Somah, but Ahmed Al-Fraidi equalised for Al-Nassr in the 61st minute to take the match to the extra time. Al Somah scored again to earn Al-Ahli a historic double of Pro League and the King Cup, which was the second time in their history after the 1977–78 season.

Qualified teams

Road to the final

Note: In all results below, the score of the finalist is given first (H: home; A: away).

Background
Al-Ahli played the 17th final, and 4th under the current edition, of which they have won twelve, a record of the competition. Their most recent final was in 2014, losing 0–3 to Al-Shabab, and their last victory was in 2012, defeating Al-Nassr 4–1.

It was Al-Nassr's second consecutive final and the 13th overall, the 3rd under the current edition. They had won six. They lost in the last year's final 6–7 on penalties after a 1–1 draw against Al-Hilal. Their last victory was in 1990, defeating Al-Taawoun 2–0.

Al-Ahli and Al-Nassr contested in five finals. Al-Ahli won thrice, the first was in 1971 with a 2–0 victory, the second was in 1973 they won 2–1, and the last victory 4–1 was in 2012. While Al-Nassr won twice, a 1–0 victory in 1974 and consecutive winning with 2–0 in 1976.

Match

References

Kings Cup (Saudi Arabia) finals
King Cup Final
Sport in Jeddah
Al-Ahli Saudi FC matches
Al Nassr FC matches